Nickelodeon is a European channel operated by Paramount Networks EMEAA which debuted in Malta on November 15, 1998.

The channel later debuted in Romania on December 24, 1998, and Hungary on January 13, 2000.

The channel launched in Ukraine on November 5, 2003, and in 2004 the channel expanded to the rest of Eastern Europe broadcasting in Russian.

The channel was launched in the Czech Republic and Slovakia on February 10, 2010, in Czech.

Nickelodeon was launched in Croatia, Montenegro, Bosnia and Herzegovina in November 2011 and in Serbia, and Slovenia on April 23, 2013, the Serbian version of the channel was also made available to Montenegro, North Macedonia and Bosnia and Herzegovina. The channel was launched in Bulgaria in November 2013. Nickelodeon was launched in Estonia, Latvia and Lithuania in October 2017. Nickelodeon was launched in Turkey on Summer 2018. It was launched in Austria on October 1, 2021, replacing the original feed. Nickelodeon was launched in Kazakhstan on April 5, 2022 and broadcasts in Kazakh.

Much like the German, Dutch and African feeds, for unknown reasons, the end credits on shows do not appear, while on most other feeds of Nickelodeon they are shown. They are replaced by short credits including the show name, production year, and production companies. There are also occasions where the end credits are skipped to the closing logos. Also, unlike other feeds, the promos and bumpers do not contain any text other than the Nickelodeon logo.

History

Nickelodeon HD Launch
In fall 2011, it was reported that Nickelodeon HD and Nick Jr. will launch in the Romania and the Czech Republic. In October, the Czech version of Nickelodeon HD began testing on satellite and is currently encrypted. Nickelodeon HD is expanded in Romania, Hungary, Czech Republic, Croatia, Bosnia and Herzegovina, Malta, Turkey, Russia, CIS, Slovakia, Poland and Kazakhstan.
On 15 February 2018 10:00 AM (at Polish Time) Nickelodeon HD is become Nicktoons (European TV channel) on Poland. On December 1, 2011, Nick Czech increased its video bitrate from constant 3,4 Mbit/s to variable 5,4 Mbit/s.

Presentation (2011-present)

In January 2012, Nick CEE got the new US look part of the Nickelodeon Worldwide 2012 Refresh. These bumpers are only used as idents and do not contain voice-overs over a short text display (like Nick UK). The bumpers for cartoons were updated on April 24, 2012. They were created by Avealmo. They are also used on Nick Latin America. Like the bumpers for the live-action programming, they do not contain a voice-over or any text indication of what show it is.

In February 2013, Nick CEE updated its on-air presentation for promos to the UK format.

In November 2013, Nick CEE underwent a refresh and received new bumpers part of the Nickelodeon Worldwide 2013 Refresh. These newly contain a voice-over.

Nickelodeon Central and Eastern Europe broadcasts commercials. In the promos for Nickelodeon shows it only shows the show name and Nickelodeon logo.

On April 1, 2015, Nickelodeon Central and Eastern Europe started broadcasting in 16:9 widescreen.

Programming blocks

Weekend Awesomeness
This programming block starts Sundays at 16:45 and airs a special episode of a certain show or movies.

Saturday Marathons
This programming block starts Saturdays at 12:00 and airs a marathon of specified shows.

External links

Nickelodeon Czech
Nickelodeon Hungary
Nickelodeon Romania

Sources 

 NICKELODEON ДОБРАЛСЯ ДО УКРАИНЫ // 05.11.2003

Central and Eastern Europe
Television channels and stations established in 1998
1998 establishments in Europe
Entertainment companies based in New York City
Television stations in Malta
Television stations in Romania
Television stations in the Czech Republic
Television channels in Slovakia
Television channels in Bulgaria
Television stations in Bosnia and Herzegovina
Television channels in Estonia
Television channels in Lithuania
Television channels in Latvia
Television stations in Ukraine
Television channels in Moldova
1998 establishments in Romania
2013 establishments in Bulgaria
2010 establishments in the Czech Republic
2010 establishments in Slovakia
2017 establishments in Estonia
2017 establishments in Lithuania
2017 establishments in Latvia
1998 establishments in Malta
Czech-language television stations
Romanian-language television stations
English-language television stations
Russian-language television stations
Bulgarian-language television stations
Television networks in Bulgaria